Hustisya  is a 2014 Filipino political thriller-drama film starring Nora Aunor. The film is about a woman working for a human trafficking agency. The film was written by Ricky Lee and directed by Joel Lamangan

The film is one of the official entries to the Directors Showcase of the 10th Cinemalaya Independent Film Festival. The film had its international premiere at the 2014 Toronto International Film Festival, under the Contemporary World Cinema selection.

Plot

Cast
Nora Aunor as Virginia Cabahug / Biring
Rocco Nacino as Atty. Gerald
Rosanna Roces as Divina
Sunshine Dizon
Romnick Sarmenta
Chynna Ortaleza as Kristal
Gardo Versoza as Gardo
Sue Prado
Jeric Gonzales as Michael
Chanel Latorre

Release
The film was exhibited at the following festivals:
10th Cinemalaya Independent Film Festival
2014 Toronto International Film Festival
30th Warsaw International Film Festival (Competition), Poland October 10–19, 2014
 36th Festival des 3 Continents, Nantes France, (Competition) November 25 - December 2, 2014
13th Pune International Film Festival (Competition), India, January 8–15, 2015

Reception
The film received mixed reviews from critics, praising the performance of Nora Aunor while criticizing the plot.

Awards and recognition

International

Philippines

References

External links
 

2014 films
Philippine independent films
Philippine political thriller films
2010s Tagalog-language films
Films directed by Joel Lamangan